Li Jukui (1904–1995) was a Chinese general and politician. He was the Petroleum Industry Minister form 1955 to 1959. Li Jukui served as the president of the Logistics Institute of the PLA.

Opposition to army crackdown in Tiananmen Square 
During the Tiananmen Square protests of spring 1989, Li Jukui signed a letter opposing the enforcement of martial law by the Army in Beijing.

References

1904 births
1995 deaths
Delegates to the 7th National Congress of the Chinese Communist Party
Government ministers of the People's Republic of China
People's Liberation Army generals from Hunan